Racing Louisville Football Club is a National Women's Soccer League team based in Louisville, Kentucky. It began playing in 2021 at Lynn Family Stadium. The team is owned by Soccer Holdings LLC, which also owns Louisville City FC of the USL Championship. The expansion team was announced on October 22, 2019.

History

Louisville was mentioned as a potential candidate for an expansion team in National Women's Soccer League as early as 2018, shortly after construction began on their soccer-specific venue, Lynn Family Stadium. The ownership group of USL Championship club Louisville City FC began preliminary discussions with the league the following year, with plans to enter in the 2020 season. Louisville's NWSL expansion team was officially announced on October 22, 2019, sharing its ownership group with Louisville City FC. It would begin play in 2021 at Lynn Family Stadium.

In November 2019, NWSL filed a trademark application for "Proof Louisville FC", which was confirmed by Louisville City FC as their preliminary name for the team. The name references the local bourbon whiskey industry by using the term "proof", a measure of alcohol content. The ownership group later announced in April 2020 that they would explore other names with community input after a mixed reception from fans. The club's new name, Racing Louisville FC, was officially unveiled on July 8, 2020. PNC Bank was announced as the club's first kit sponsor on July 1, 2020, with the company's logo appearing on the back of the team's jerseys. On December 17, 2020, Louisville City announced that GE Appliances, which had already been that club's primary shirt sponsor (i.e., on the front of the kit), would expand this sponsorship to include all clubs under the Louisville City umbrella, including Racing.

Former Sky Blue FC head coach Christy Holly was named as Racing Louisville FC's first head coach on August 12, 2020. The club made their NWSL debut in the 2021 NWSL Challenge Cup, where they finished at the bottom of the East Division with two losses and two draws. Racing Louisville FC made their home debut on May 15, 2021, playing to a scoreless draw against Kansas City NWSL.

Holly was fired for cause on August 31, 2021, and the club named Mario Sanchez, head of the club's youth academy and former collegiate coach, as the interim head coach. After the season, veteran Swedish manager Kim Björkegren was named as the permanent replacement. In 2022, a report from US Soccer revealed that Holly had allegedly sexually abused players as coach of Racing.

Club identity

Racing Louisville FC is named in reference to the city's horse racing venues, including the Kentucky Derby at Churchill Downs, using the "Racing" moniker used by foreign clubs. The club's circular crest uses a lavender background and a four-pointed fleur-de-lis at its center in violet. It was designed by Matthew Wolff, who had previously worked with Major League Soccer teams New York City FC and Los Angeles FC.

Stadium and facilities

The club shares Lynn Family Stadium and its training facilities with Louisville City FC. The soccer-specific stadium, opened in 2020, has a seated capacity of 11,600, with standing-room capacity up to 15,304. The  training facilities at Louisville Champions Park includes several practice fields and an indoor gymnasium and office complex.

Players and staff

Current squad

Out on loan

Staff

Head coaches
  Christy Holly (2021)
  Mario Sanchez (interim; 2021)
  Kim Björkegren (2022–)

Record

Year-by-year

References

External links
 

 
2019 establishments in Kentucky
Association football clubs established in 2019
National Women's Soccer League teams
Soccer clubs in Kentucky
Women's soccer clubs in the United States
USL W League teams